Tillsonburg Regional Airport  is located  north of Tillsonburg, Ontario, Canada.

The Tillsonburg Regional Airport was built during World War II as the secondary relief field, or R2, for Royal Canadian Air Force No. 14 Service Flying Training School in Aylmer, Ontario, part of the British Commonwealth Air Training Plan, and was purchased by the Town of Tillsonburg in 1970. The airport is a general aviation facility home to several organizations and businesses. Regular users of the airport include the Ontario Provincial Police, Ornge (Ontario Air Ambulance), Canadian Coast Guard and corporate aircraft.

The airport is home to the Canadian Harvard Aircraft Association (CHAA) which is headquartered at the airport and maintains a fleet of Harvard aircraft.

A new terminal building was erected in 2010 and is located just south of the existing ATB.

The airport has a restaurant called the SkyWay Cafe which is open 7 days a week, serving breakfast and lunch until 2 pm.

The airport is owned and operated by the Town of Tillsonburg. From a governance perspective, there is also the Tillsonburg Airport Advisory Committee which provides recommendations to Tillsonburg Town Council. The current Chair of the TAAC is Mark Renaud.

The airport also has one flight school.

The Tillsonburg Regional Airport has the only paved runway in Oxford and nearby Norfolk Counties.

The airport is classified as an airport of entry by Nav Canada and is staffed by the Canada Border Services Agency (CBSA). CBSA officers at this airport can handle general aviation aircraft with up to 15 passengers.

Since the expansion in 2010; the airport continues to demonstrate increased take-offs and landings as evidenced by reports published by Transport Canada.

References

Registered aerodromes in Ontario
Tillsonburg
Buildings and structures in Oxford County, Ontario
Transport in Oxford County, Ontario